So Am I may refer to:

 "So Am I" (Ava Max song), 2019
 "So Am I" (Ty Dolla Sign song), 2017
 "So Am I", 1924 song written by Ira Gershwin and composed by George Gershwin, first heard in Lady, Be Good (musical)
 "So Am I", 1994 song by Alison Moyet from Essex
 "So Am I", 2006 song by Trent Willmon from A Little More Livin'

See also 
 También Yo, album by Daniela Romo, also known as So Do I or So Am I
 So Do I (disambiguation)